is a Japanese manga artist known for his seinen manga series Kokou no Hito and the Innocent duology. Both Kokou no Hito and Innocent were awarded an Excellence Award at the Japan Media Arts Festival. His newest series #DRCL midnight children began serialization in Grand Jump in 2021.

Works

Manga 
  (1995) 
  (1995) 
  (April 19, 2004 – November 18, 2005) 
  (2005 – 2006, illustrations)
  (2007 – 2012)
  (January 31, 2013 – April 16, 2015)
  (May 20, 2015 – January 8, 2020)
 #DRCL midnight children (January 20, 2021 – present)

Other 
  (2020, Artbook)
  (2020, one-shot doujinshi)
  (2021, Cover art)

Awards 
2010 (14th) Japan Media Arts Festival, Excellence Prize for Manga (for Kokou no Hito) 
2011 Prix Mangawa Awards, Best Seinen Manga (for Kokou no Hito)
2013 (17th) Japan Media Arts Festival, Jury Selection for Manga (for Innocent)
2014 (18th) Tezuka Osamu Cultural Prize, Reader Award Nomination (for Innocent)
2015 (8th) Manga Taishō, Nomination (for Innocent)
2021 (24th) Japan Media Arts Festival, Excellence Award for Manga (for Innocent Rouge)

References

External links
 

1972 births
Living people
Manga artists from Osaka Prefecture